The Forts of Rome are the complex of fixed works of military defense constituting the entrenched field of the city, consisting of fifteen "Prussian"-type forts and four hexagonal batteries.

After some controversies about the project, the forts were commissioned by Royal Decree nr. 4007 of August 12, 1877.
The first seven forts (Monte Mario, Braschi, Boccea, Aurelia Antica, Bravetta, Portuense and Appia Antica) were built starting from the same year 1877 on the right side of the Tiber (except for the Forte Appia Antica), as a defence against landings on the coast of the Tyrrhenian Sea.
The construction of the remaining eight forts (Antenne, Ardeatina, Casilina, Ostiense, Pietralata, Prenestina, Tiburtina and Trionfale) began in 1880 thanks to new funds; by Royal Decree of November 1, 1882, they were named after the streets on which they stood.
The four batteries were built in an intermediate and set-back position: they were called Tevere (on the right bank of the river under Monte Mario), Appia Pignatelli, Porta Furba and Nomentana.

All the buildings soon fell into disuse, due both to their excessive closeness to the expanding city and to the evolution of the ballistic techniques and of the military strategies; by Royal Decree n. 2179 of October 9, 1919 they were removed from the list of the State fortifications and used as barracks and military depots. Later they ended up being incorporated into the urban fabric and, in some case, were delivered to the Municipality of Rome; however, some of them are currently unused or abandoned.

List

Bibliography

External links 
 
 

Forts in Italy
Modern history of Italy